
Year 698 (DCXCVIII) was a common year starting on Tuesday (link will display the full calendar) of the Julian calendar. The denomination 698 for this year has been used since the early medieval period, when the Anno Domini calendar era became the prevalent method in Europe for naming years.

Events 
 By place 
 Byzantine Empire 
 Spring–summer – Arab forces under Hasan ibn al-Nu'man capture Carthage, ending Byzantine rule in North Africa. The defeated Byzantine fleet revolts and proclaims Tiberios III, who deposes Leontios after a brief siege of Constantinople, Byzantine Emperor.
 Autumn–winter – The Byzantine general Heraclius, brother of Tiberios III, crosses the mountain passes of the Taurus Mountains into Cilicia with an army. He launches a campaign in Syria, defeats an Arab force from Antioch, and raids as far as Samosata (modern Turkey).
 Outbreak of bubonic plague in Constantinople, Syria and Mesopotamia. Theophanes the Confessor reports that the plague lasted four months and describes a large number of deaths in Constantinople. Emperor Leontios orders the destruction of a market in the Neorion cargo port of Constantinople, where animals are sold and which is considered to be the source of infected animals brought from Syria. The Arab army is forced to suspend its military operations. According to Syrian sources, the plague in Syria lasted another two years.

 Europe 
 Wittiza, son of King Ergica, becomes co-ruler of the Visigoth Kingdom in Hispania (approximate date).

 Britain 
 Berhtred, Anglo-Saxon nobleman, is killed leading a Northumbrian army against the Picts. The kingdom of Cait (or Cat) in northern Scotland is absorbed (approximate date).
 Fiannamail ua Dúnchado becomes king of Dál Riata (Scotland), until his death around 700 (approximate date).

 Arabian Empire 
 Berber forces led by Queen Kahina ("The Diviner") are crushed by Arab invaders at Aures (Algeria). She has rallied the Berbers since the collapse of Byzantine power (see 647).

 Asia 
 Dae Jo-young establishes the kingdom of Balhae in Manchuria (approximate date).
 Khun Lo, a Thai prince, conquers Muang Sua, an early Laotian kingdom.
 Qapaghan Qaghan conquers parts of Transoxiana (Central Asia).
 The festival of first-fruits (Daijo-sai) is held in Japan.

 Central America 
March 24 – Itzamnaaj K'awiil becomes the new ruler of the Mayan city state at Dos Pilas in Guatemala and reigns until 726.

 By topic 
 Religion 
 Council of Aquileia: The bishops of the diocese of Aquileia decide to end the Schism of the Three Chapters and return to communion with Rome.
 Willibrord, Anglo-Saxon missionary, establishes an abbey at Echternach (Luxembourg), presented to him by Irmina, daughter of King Dagobert II.
 Probable date of Cuthbert's burial behind the altar at Lindisfarne (approximate date).
 Princess Taki is sent to Saikū, as a Saiō of the Ise Shrine (Japan).

Births 
 Dagobert III, king of the Franks (d. 715) 
 Shang, emperor of the Tang Dynasty (or 695)
 Wang Changling, Chinese poet and official (d. 756)

Deaths 
 May 6 – Eadberht, bishop of Lindisfarne
 July 22 – Wu Chengsi, nephew of Chinese sovereign Wu Zetian
 Ainbcellach mac Ferchair, king of Dál Riata (Scotland)
 Berthtred, Anglo-Saxon noblemen (approximate date)
 Rieul, bishop of Reims (approximate date)
 Suraqah al-Bariqi, Arab poet (b. 621)
 Trudo, Frankish abbot (approximate date)

References

Sources